Roberto González is an Argentine association football midfielder.

Career
In 1994–95, González played for Rosario Central.  In February 1996, the San Jose Clash selected him in the first round (third overall) of the 1996 MLS Supplemental Draft.  On March 26, 1996, the Clash waived him.  He played for numerous Argentinian teams during the 2000s.

References

External links
 Roberto Ariel González

Living people
1976 births
Argentine footballers
Rosario Central footballers
Crucero del Norte footballers
Central Córdoba de Rosario footballers
San Jose Earthquakes draft picks
Argentino de Rosario footballers
Association football midfielders